is a passenger railway station in the city of Funabashi, Chiba Prefecture, Japan, operated by the private railway operator Keisei Electric Railway.

Lines
Daijingūshita Station is served by the Keisei Main Line, and is located 26.4 km from the terminus of the line at Keisei Ueno Station.

Station layout
The station consists of  two elevated opposed side platforms connected via an underpass to the station building underneath.

Platforms

History
Daijingūshita Station was opened on 17 December 1921. In 2004, Platform 1 was elevated, and in 2006, platform 2 was elevated. 

Station numbering was introduced to all Keisei Line stations on 17 July 2010. Daijingūshita was assigned station number KS23.

Passenger statistics
In fiscal 2019, the station was used by an average of 5,071 passengers daily.

Surrounding area
 Funabashi-Daijingū Shrine

See also
 List of railway stations in Japan

References

External links

  

Railway stations in Japan opened in 1921
Railway stations in Chiba Prefecture
Keisei Main Line
Funabashi